The Weinbergerhaus is a privately run mountain hut, 1,270 metres high, in the Kaisergebirge mountains in Austria above the town of Kufstein/Tyrol.

Location 
The Weinbergerhaus is located on the Brentenjoch saddle in the Wilder Kaiser nature reserve in the Kaisergebirge. For that reason the mountain hut used to be called the Brentenjoch Hut. Towards the west the view takes in the Inn valley, Kufstein and Kiefersfelden, and, to the north in clear weather, Rosenheim can be made out. To the east of the Weinbergerhaus is the Gamskogel peak (1448 m) and a rolling alm where dairy cows graze in the summer. To the south the rugged crags of the Wilder Kaiser form an impressive backdrop against the light, especially at sunrise and sunset.

Access 
by car via the A12 (Austria) or A93 (Germany) to the Kufstein Nord exit and then to the valley station of the Kaiserlift or to the car park in Kufstein Mitterndorf at the edge of the wood. 
by rail to Kufstein station and then on foot to the start of the climbing path in Mitterndorf or the Josef Madersperger memorial (both 15 min) or by town bus to the Meraner Straße bus stop, a few minutes walk from the Kaiserlift valley station.

Approaches 
on the Kaiserlift to the top station at Brentenjoch (only May–October) and a ten-minute walk 
from Kufstein-Sparchen (501 m) through the Duxeralm and along the Adler Way (Adlerweg) in 1½ hours
from the Josef Madersperger memorial (Kienbach) along the Elfenhain (trail) to the Duxeralm and along the Schneerosen Way (Schneerosenweg, trail) and the Panorama Way (Panoramaweg) in 2½ hours
from the centre of Kufstein and Mitterndorf via the Berghaus Aschenbrenner and the Panorama Way in 2½ hours

Crossings 
along the Adler Way to the Kaindl Hut (easy, 1 hour)
over the Gamskogel (1,449 m) to the Kaindl Hut (trail, 1½ hours)
along the Bettler Trail (Bettlersteig) to Anton Karg Haus (Hinterbärenbad) in the Kaisertal valley (2½ hours)
From the Kaindl Hut or the Anton Karg Haus the trip may be extended into worthwhile circular or multi-day tours (of all levels of difficulty).

Summer sport 
The Weinbergerhaus may be reached by mountain bike from Kufstein-Mitterndorf on two trails, either via Berghaus Aschenbrenner or the Duxeralm. There is also a round trip, that can be extended with a short spur to the Kaindl Hut. 
The same trails are used by fell runners. 
It is also possible to paraglide from the Weinbergerhaus.

Winter sport 
 There is a toboggan run through the Brentenjoch to the Duxeralm. From there via Waldkapelle to Mitterndorf or via the ski piste to the Hinterduxer Hof and then along the toboggan run to Sparchen (note when it is closed!).
From the Weinbergerhaus there is an unprepared, but avalanche-safe ski piste down to the car park of the Kaiserlift, which may also be ascended by ski tourists.

Literature 
 Kompass Wander-, Bike- und Skitourenkarte 09; Kufstein, Walchensee, St. Johann in Tirol; 1:25000

External links 
 Franz Weinberger

Mountain huts in Tyrol (state)
Kaiser Mountains